The Baldwin brothers are four American actors.

Baldwin brothers may also refer to:

 The Baldwin Brothers, a Chicago band (including no one named Baldwin)
 The Baldwin Brothers (film), a 1996 television documentary about the acting family